Raynold B. Oilouch (born 1965 or 1966) is a Palauan politician who served as the Vice President of Palau 19 January 2017 to 21 January 2021. Oilouch was elected Vice President in the 2016 elections. He is also the minister of justice.

Before his term as Vice President, he served as senator from Ngchesar in the Senate of Palau.

Oilouch has a bachelor's degrees of both social sciences and economics from Canberra College of Advanced Education. He has also been practicing law in Palau since 1998.

References

Living people
Vice presidents of Palau
Members of the Senate of Palau
Place of birth missing (living people)
Year of birth missing (living people)
Justice Ministers of Palau
21st-century Palauan politicians